Drishyam Films is an independent Indian film production company. It was founded by Manish Mundra in 2014, and saw its first success with the release of the award-winning film Ankhon Dekhi in 2014. Other acclaimed releases include Umrika (2015 Sundance Audience Choice Award), Dhanak (2015 Berlinale Grand Jury Prize), and Masaan (2015 Cannes Film Festival Awards).

In May 2017, Drishyam films launched a $20m fund to produce eight to ten independent Indian films over the next two years.

Filmography

References

External links

Hindi cinema
Film production companies based in Mumbai
Producers who won the Best Children's Film National Film Award